P. T. Kunju Muhammed is a director and producer in Malayalam film industry. Magrib was his first film venture.  He received a number of awards for his movies at the state level.

Personal life 
He is a native of Pancharamukku near Chavakkad in Thrissur district, Kerala. He is married and they have two children.
Kunju Muhammed was elected twice to the Kerala legislative assembly as a left independent candidate in 1994 and 1996. He graduated in mathematics from St. Thomas College, Thrissur.

Film career
His debut film was Magrib (1993). Later he directed  Garshom (1998), Paradeshi (2007) and Veeraputhran (2011). These films got critical acclaim and received number of awards. Kunhimohammed’s entry to film was as a producer and an actor. He was involved in the production of  Aswathamavu, Swaroopam, Purushartham all directed by K. R. Mohanan. He acted in the movie Uppu (Salt)  which was directed by Pavithran.

Kunhimohammed is one among the founder directors of the Malayalam Channel Kairali TV. Currently, he is presenting a popular program in Kairali TV the so-called ‘Pravasalokam’, a program for finding missing Kerala expatriates in different parts of the world.

Filmography

 2017-Viswasapoorvam Mansoor 
 2011- Veeraputhran 
 2007- Paradesi 
 1998- Garshom 
 1993- Magrib 
 1987- Uppu

References

External links 
 

1949 births
Living people
Malayali politicians
Malayalam screenwriters
People from Thrissur district
Film directors from Kerala
Malayalam film directors
Kerala State Film Award winners
St. Thomas College, Thrissur alumni
Members of the Kerala Legislative Assembly
Malayalam film producers
Film producers from Kerala
20th-century Indian film directors
21st-century Indian film directors
Screenwriters from Kerala